Lilit Harutyunyan may refer to:

 Lilit Harutyunyan (gymnast) (born 1995), Armenian rhythmic gymnast
 Lilit Harutyunyan (athlete) (born 1993), Armenian hurdler